The BC-41 was a combined knuckleduster and dagger weapon used by the British Commandos during World War II for close combat and ambushes. Although effective, it was eventually replaced by the Fairbairn–Sykes fighting knife.

See also
 Combat knife
 Yarara Parachute Knife
 Mark I trench knife
 Special Air Service
 Royal Marines

Further reading
Buerlein, Robert. (2002). Allied Military Fighting Knives: And The Men Who Made Them Famous. Paladin Press. 
Flook, Ron. (1999). British and Commonwealth Military Knives. Howell Press Inc. 
Locken, Alan. (1995). The Collectors Guide to the Fairbairn Sykes Fighting Knife. Alan W Locken.

External links
 History of the Fairbairn-Sykes Fighting knife
 

Daggers
World War II infantry weapons of the United Kingdom
Royal Marines
Military knives
Military equipment introduced from 1940 to 1944